E. antiquus  may refer to:
 Elephas antiquus, the straight-tusked elephant, an extinct species of elephant closely related to the living Asian elephant
 Entelodon antiquus, an extinct mammal species